Machines of Loving Grace were an American industrial rock band.

Machines of Loving Grace may also refer to: 

Machines of Loving Grace (album), a 1991 album by the band
 "Machines of Loving Grace", a 2009 song by Princess Chelsea from Lil' Golden Book
 Machines of Loving Grace: The Quest for Common Ground Between Humans and Robots, a 2015 nonfiction book by John Markoff

See also
 All Watched Over by Machines of Loving Grace (disambiguation)